The Faroe Islands first competed at the Summer Paralympic Games in 1984, and have competed in every edition of the Summer Paralympics since then. They have never participated in the Winter Paralympic Games.

The Faroe Islands have their own National Paralympic Committee and National Olympic Committee. They are, however, one of only two territories (along with Macau) to compete at the Paralympics but not at the Olympics. Faroese athletes compete as representatives of its mother country Denmark at the Olympic Games.

Faroese Paralympians have won a total of thirteen medals, of which one gold, seven silver and five bronze. Their most successful appearance was at the 1988 Games, where they won seven medals and Christina Næss won the Faroe Islands' first and only Paralympic gold medal, in the C3 100m backstroke in swimming.
 
The Faroe Islands have only ever sent swimmers to the Paralympics, with the exceptions of Heini Festirstein, who competed in table tennis in 1992, and Hávard Vatnhamar, who competed in the marathlon (athletics) in 2020.

List of medalists

See also 
Faroese Confederation of Sports & Olympic Committee
Football in the Faroe Islands
Sport in Macau

References